Tommy Greenwald (born April 27, 1962) is an American playwright and children’s book author. Greenwald co-wrote John & Jen with Andrew Lippa.
 
His debut middle-grade fiction book was Charlie Joe Jackson’s Guide to Not Reading, a humorous book about a reluctant reader. He also wrote the lyrics for the

Bibliography
 Charlie Joe Jackson's Guide to Not Reading, Roaring Brook Press, 2011
 Charlie Joe Jackson's Guide to Extra Credit, Roaring Brook Press, 2012
 Charlie Joe Jackson's Guide to Summer Vacation, Roaring Brook Press, 2013
 Jack Strong Takes a Stand, Roaring Brook Press, 2013
 Charlie Joe Jackson's Guide to Making Money, Roaring Brook Press, 2014
Katie Friedman Gives Up Texting! (And Lives to Tell About It), Roaring Brook Press, 2015
Charlie Joe Jackson's Guide to Planet Girl, Roaring Book Press, 2015
Charlie Joe Jacksons guide to not reading and getting good grades. 2021
Club Donald Duck 1: Nieuwe vrienden 
Club Donald Duck 2: Jacht op het spook 
Club Donald Duck 3: Metro op hol 
Club Donald Duck Duck Scares 1 
Club Donald Duck Duck Scares 2 
Club Donald Duck Duck Scares 3

References

External links
 Tommy Greenwald’s website

American dramatists and playwrights
American children's writers
Living people
1962 births